Jangal is a city and capital of Jangal District, in Roshtkhar County, Razavi Khorasan Province, Iran. At the 2006 census, its population was 6,232, in 1,384 families.  Jangal means "jungle" or "forest" in Persian.

References 

Populated places in Roshtkhar County
Cities in Razavi Khorasan Province